Adolphe (Adolf Wilhelm August Karl Friedrich; 24 July 1817 – 17 November 1905) was Grand Duke of Luxembourg from 23 November 1890 to his death on 17 November 1905. The first grand duke from the House of Nassau-Weilburg, he succeeded King William III of the Netherlands, ending the personal union between the Netherlands and Luxembourg. Adolphe was Duke of Nassau from 20 August 1839 to 20 September 1866, when the Duchy was annexed to the Kingdom of Prussia.

Adolphe became Duke of Nassau in August 1839, following the death of his father William. The Duchy was annexed to Prussia after Austria's defeat in the Austro-Prussian War. From 1815 to 1839, Grand Duchy of Luxembourg was ruled by the kings of the Netherlands as a province of the Netherlands. Following the Treaty of London (1839), the Grand Duchy of Luxembourg became independent but remained in personal union with the Netherlands. Following the death of his sons, the Dutch king William III had no male heirs to succeed him. In the Netherlands, females were allowed to succeed to the throne. Luxembourg, however, followed Salic law which barred females from succession. Thus, upon King William III's death, the crown of the Netherlands passed to his only daughter, Wilhelmina, while that of Luxembourg passed to Adolphe in accordance with the Nassau Family Pact. Adolphe died in 1905 and was succeeded by his son, William IV.

Biography
He was a son of William, Duke of Nassau (1792–1839), and his first wife, Princess Louise of Saxe-Hildburghausen. Adolphe's half-sister, Sophia of Nassau, was the wife of Oscar II of Sweden.

Duke of Nassau

Adolphe became Duke of Nassau in August 1839 at the age of 22, after the death of his father. Wiesbaden had by this time become the capital of the Duchy and Adolphe took up residence in the newly constructed Stadtschloss in 1841. On 4 March 1848 he consented to the population of Nassau's nine "Demands of the Nassauers". A few years later, however, he revoked his liberal views and took a strongly conservative and reactionary course. In general, though, he was seen as a popular ruler. He supported the Austrian Empire in the Austro-Prussian War of 1866. After Austria's defeat, Nassau was annexed to the Kingdom of Prussia and he lost his throne on 20 September 1866.

Grand Duke of Luxembourg
In 1879, Adolphe's niece Emma of Waldeck and Pyrmont, the daughter of another of his half-sisters, married William III, King of the Netherlands and Grand Duke of Luxembourg. In 1890, their only daughter Wilhelmina succeeded on his death without surviving male issue to the Dutch throne, but was excluded from the succession to Luxembourg by Salic Law. The Grand Duchy, which had been linked to the Netherlands in personal union since 1815, passed to Adolphe in accordance with the Nassau Family Pact. Adolphe was King-Grand Duke William III's 17th cousin once removed through a male-only line, but was also his 3rd cousin as they both descended from William IV, Prince of Orange (he being the paternal  great-grandson of William IV's eldest daughter Princess Carolina of Orange-Nassau.)

He had, in fact, taken over the regency of Luxembourg for a short time during William III's illness.

In any case, as he was already 73 years old and knew little of Luxembourgish politics, he left his hands off the day-to-day governing. The prime minister Paul Eyschen, in office since 1888, took care of the affairs of state, and this created a tradition that the ruler would remain absent from the politics of the day. In 1902 Adolphe appointed his son William as Lieutenant-Representative. He died in 1905 at his summer home, Schloss Hohenburg in Lenggries, and in 1953 was buried in the crypt of the church of Schloss Weilburg.

Marriage and family
On 31 January 1844, Adolphe married firstly in St. Petersburg Grand Duchess Elizabeth Mikhailovna of Russia, niece of Emperor Nicholas I of Russia. She died less than a year afterwards giving birth to a stillborn daughter. Adolphe built the Russian Orthodox Church of Saint Elizabeth 1847 to 1855 as her funeral church.

On 23 April 1851, he remarried in Princess Adelheid-Marie of Anhalt-Dessau. They had five children, of whom only two lived to the age of eighteen and became prince and princess of Luxembourg:

 William IV, Grand Duke of Luxembourg (1852–1912)
 Prince Friedrich Paul Wilhelm of Nassau (Biebrich, 23 September 1854 – Biebrich, 23 October 1855)
 Princess Marie Bathildis Wilhelmine Charlotte of Nassau (Biebrich, 14 November 1857 – Biebrich, 28 December 1857)
 Prince Franz Joseph Wilhelm of Nassau (Biebrich, 30 January 1859 – Vienna, 2 April 1875)
 Princess Hilda Charlotte Wilhelmine (1864–1952), married Friedrich II, Grand Duke of Baden.

In 1892, Grand Duke Adolphe conferred the personal title of Prince Bernadotte in the nobility of Luxembourg as well as the hereditary title of Count of Wisborg on his Swedish nephew, Oscar, who had lost his Swedish titles after marrying without his father's approval. Wisborg (also spelled Visborg) is the ruins of an old castle in the city of Visby within Oscar's former Dukedom of Gotland, but the title itself was created in the nobility of Luxembourg.

Adelsverein
On April 20, 1842, the Adelsverein, Society for the Protection of German Immigrants in Texas, was organised in the Grand Duke's castle at Biebrich on the Rhine.  He was named the Protector of the organisation. The Verein was responsible for the large emigration of Germans to Texas in the 19th Century, and on January 9, 1843, established the 4,428 acre Nassau Plantation in Fayette County, Texas and named it after the Grand Duke.

Honours

Arms

References

External links

 Adolphe's page on the official website of the Grand-Ducal House of Luxembourg

1817 births
1905 deaths
People from Wiesbaden
People from the Duchy of Nassau
Dukes of Nassau
Grand Dukes of Luxembourg
House of Nassau-Weilburg
Protestant monarchs
Luxembourgian Protestants
Burials in the Royal Crypt of Weilburg Schlosskirche
Generals of Cavalry (Prussia)
19th-century Luxembourgian people
Grand Crosses of the Order of Saint Stephen of Hungary
Royal reburials